Havaligi is a little village in Andhra Pradesh. It lies on the border between Andhara Pradesh and Karnataka.

References 

Villages in Anantapur district